Zipper Spy is a project by the American multimedia artist Maria Moran which incorporates a variety of
sound and visual sources, especially zippers. She was married to Emil Beaulieau, an American noise artist.

Discography
Watch Your Damage (CD) (Vinyl Communications 1997)
Living In A Free World? (12")	(Stichting Mixer 1999)
Extortionist (12") (The Homewrecker Foundation 1999)
Icki Beats (CD)	(Ground Fault Recordings 1999)
Japan 2000 (CDr) (RRRecords 2000)
Untitled (2x12") (K.Ktus Tribe Record 2000)
Untitled (12") (K.Ktus Tribe Record 2001)

American experimental musical groups